The 2022 Worldwide Express 250 for Carrier Appreciation was the 18th stock car race of the 2022 NASCAR Camping World Truck Series, the second race of the Round of 10, and the 14th iteration of the event. The race was held on Saturday, August 13, 2022, in Richmond, Virginia at Richmond Raceway, a  permanent D-shaped racetrack. The race was contested over 250 laps. Chandler Smith, driving for Kyle Busch Motorsports, dominated the majority of the race, leading 176 laps for his fifth career NASCAR Camping World Truck Series win, along with his third of the season. He would also earn a spot in the next round of the playoffs. To fill out the podium, John Hunter Nemechek, driving for Kyle Busch Motorsports, and Ty Majeski, driving for ThorSport Racing, would finish 2nd and 3rd, respectively.

Background 
It hosts the NASCAR Cup Series, NASCAR Xfinity Series and the NASCAR Camping World Truck Series. Known as "America's premier short track", it has formerly hosted events such as the International Race of Champions, Denny Hamlin Short Track Showdown, and the USAC sprint car series. Due to Richmond Raceway's unique "D" shape which allows drivers to reach high speeds, its racing grooves, and proclivity for contact Richmond is a favorite among NASCAR drivers and fans.

Entry list 

 (R) denotes rookie driver.
 (i) denotes driver who are ineligible for series driver points.

Notes

Practice 
The only 30-minute practice session was held on Saturday, August 13, at 3:30 PM EST.

Qualifying 
Qualifying was held on Friday, July 29, at 5:05 PM EST. Since Richmond Raceway is a short track, the qualifying system used is a single-car, two-lap system with only one round. Whoever sets the fastest time in the round wins the pole.

Race results 
Stage 1 Laps: 70

Stage 2 Laps: 70

Stage 3 Laps: 110

Standings after the race 

Drivers' Championship standings

Note: Only the first 10 positions are included for the driver standings.

References 

2022 NASCAR Camping World Truck Series
NASCAR races at Richmond Raceway
Worldwide Express 250
2022 in sports in Virginia